Gary Blackney (born December 12, 1944) is an American retired college football coach. He served as the head football coach at  Bowling Green State University from 1991 to 2000. Blackney also worked as an assistant football coach at Ohio State University, Syracuse University, University of California, Los Angeles (UCLA), the University of Wisconsin–Madison, the University of Rhode Island, the University of Central Florida (UCF), and Brown University. He was the  defensive coordinator at University of Maryland, College Park from 2001 to 2005. He retired from coaching after the 2008 season.

Head coaching record

References

1944 births
Living people
Bowling Green Falcons football coaches
Brown Bears football coaches
UConn Huskies football players
Maryland Terrapins football coaches
Ohio State Buckeyes football coaches
Rhode Island Rams football coaches
Syracuse Orange football coaches
UCF Knights football coaches
UCLA Bruins football coaches
Wisconsin Badgers football coaches
People from Plainview, New York